Pimelea serpyllifolia, commonly known as the thyme riceflower, is a species of plant in the family Thymelaeaceae that is endemic to southern Australia. It is a small dioecious shrub that grows to 1.5 m in height where sheltered, though it has a prostrate or stunted habit in exposed positions.  The stems are glabrous and the leaves small and blue-green. It bears clusters of tiny yellow flowers.

References

serphyllifolia
Malvales of Australia
Flora of New South Wales
Flora of South Australia
Flora of Victoria (Australia)
Flora of Western Australia
Plants described in 1810
Dioecious plants